Wabash Precinct is one of the eight precincts of Wabash County, Illinois. Allendale, Illinois is the precinct seat.

Precincts in Wabash County, Illinois